Hiram Richard Hulse (September 15, 1868 - April 10, 1938) was the second missionary Bishop of the Diocese of Cuba in The Episcopal Church.

Early life

Hulse was born to Richard Hulse and Selina Richards. In the first decade of the 20th century, the new rector of St. Mary's in Harlem, the Rev. Hiram Richard Hulse, urged construction of a new sanctuary. In 1908 the demolition took place of the old white frame church and, on the same site, construction of the brick Carrere & Hastings building with cast stone detail and bell cote. The first service was held on New Year's Day, 1909.

Hulse married Frances Burrows Seymour on May 20, 1903, and had three children: Mary, Frederick, and Charity. Hulse and his wife were among the passengers aboard the cruise ship SS Morro Castle when it caught fire on September 8, 1934, killing 137 passengers and crew.

Episcopate

On 12 January 1915, in New York City, Hiram Hulse was consecrated as a bishop in Cuba for the Protestant Episcopal Church assisted by Bishop de Landes Berghes in the Mathew line.

See also

 List of Succession of Bishops for the Episcopal Church, USA

Notes

Sources
 Annual Address (1922)
 Marriage Notice

External links
Grave at Lewis Memorial Park
Morro Castle disaster page

1831 births
1888 deaths
Religious leaders from New York City
American expatriates in Cuba
19th-century American Episcopalians
American Episcopal priests
American religious leaders
20th-century Anglican bishops in the Caribbean
American expatriate bishops
Episcopal bishops of Cuba
19th-century American clergy
20th-century American clergy